Tambobamba is a town in southern Peru, capital of the province Cotabambas in the region Apurímac.

References

Populated places in the Apurímac Region